The  was a commercial treaty signed in April 1506 by King Henry VII of England and Duke Philip IV of Burgundy.

Background and detail 
Continuing frictions with the Company of Merchant Adventurers of London, combined with Henry's desire to secure Edmund de la Pole, 3rd Duke of Suffolk, the leading Yorkist heir, sheltering in Burgundy, led Henry to attempt further negotiations, even after the ratification of the Intercursus Magnus in 1496. A shipwreck in 1506 left Philip stranded in England en route to claiming the Castilian inheritance of his wife, Joanna the Mad.

This replacement removed all duties from English textile exports without reciprocity and with little compensation for the Burgundians.  49-year-old Henry, widowed three years previously, also arranged to be married to Philip's sister, the twice-widowed 26-year-old Margaret. Finally Philip of Burgundy was forced to hand over Edmund de la Pole. Henry also recognised Philip and Joanna as the rulers of Castille (seeing as Queen Isabella I of Castile had died in 1504). After handing over de la Pole, Philip and Joanna were allowed to leave England after a forced stay of six weeks.

Margaret's objection—both to the marriage and the treaty more generally—meant that, on Philip's death that September and Margaret's appointment as Governor of the Habsburg Netherlands (and de facto ruler), the treaty was not ratified being replaced instead by a third treaty in 1507, repeating the terms of the first.

References 

1500s treaties
1506 in Europe
16th-century economic history
Commercial treaties
Treaties of England
Treaties of the Burgundian Netherlands